Gurdwara Darbar Sahib Kartarpur, also called Kartarpur Sahib, is a gurdwara in Kartarpur, located in Shakargarh, Narowal District, in the Punjab province of Pakistan. It is built on the historic site where the founder of Sikhism, Guru Nanak, settled and assembled the Sikh community after his missionary travels (udasis to Haridwar, Mecca-Medina, Lanka, Baghdad, Kashmir and Nepal) and lived for 18 years until his death in 1539. It is one of the holiest sites in Sikhism, alongside the Golden Temple in Amritsar and Gurdwara Janam Asthan in Nankana Sahib.

The gurdwara is also notable for its location near the border between Pakistan and India. The shrine is visible from the Indian side of the border. Indian Sikhs gather in large numbers on bluffs to perform darshan, or sacred viewing of the site, from the Indian side of the border. The Kartarpur Corridor was opened by Pakistani Prime Minister Imran Khan on 9 November 2019, the anniversary of the fall of the Berlin Wall and just days before the 550th birth anniversary of Guru Nanak. This historic moment officially allowed Indian Sikh pilgrims rare visa-free access to the site in Pakistan. It is also claimed to be the largest gurdwara in the world.

Location

Gurdwara Kartarpur Sahib is located in the Shakargarh Tehsil of the Narowal District in Punjab, Pakistan. It is a top tourist attraction for people visiting Pakistan. The shrine is located five kilometres from the Indo-Pakistani border.

Significance

The gurdwara was built to commemorate the site where Guru Nanak, the founder of Sikhism, settled after his missionary work and did farming. Guru Nanak founded the Kartarpur town by Ravi River in 1504, plowing the fields and setting up a community kitchen, or Langar. He assembled a Sikh commune there, and lived for 18 years until his death on 22 September 1539. The gurdwara is built where Guru Nanak is said to have died. It is therefore the second holiest site of the Sikh religion after Gurdwara Janam Asthan – the birthplace of Guru Nanak located in Nankana Sahib, Pakistan.

Here, Guru Nanak gave the three principles of Kirat Karo, Naam Japo, Wand Chako, which means work hard for a livelihood, keep remembering the God and share your bounties with the world. Guru's teachings have been peace, harmony and universal brotherhood. Guru Nanak believed in equality between castes, religions, and genders and gave the word Ik Onkar meaning there is only one God.

According to Lahore-based art historian Fakr Syed Aijazuddin, the shrine houses the last copies of the original Guru Granth Sahib. A Sikh pilgrim remarked, "every step here reminds us of the Guru's life". Indian Sikhs gather in large numbers on bluffs on the Indian side of the border to obtain darshan, or sacred viewing, of the site.

As per popular legend, after Guru Nanak died, there was a dispute between the local Hindus and Muslims. Muslims, who saw him as their pir, wanted to bury him while Hindus, who claimed Nanak as their guru, wanted to cremate his body. But the legend follows that Guru Nanak's body was turned into flowers, which were then divided between the two communities.

Shrine
The Shrine is located at Kartarpur, a small town beside the River Ravi in Punjab and it is one of the holiest places for up to 30 million Sikhs around the world. The main shrine building was built in 1925 at a cost of Rs. 1,35,600, donated by Sardar Bhupindar Singh, the Maharaja of Patiala. It was repaired by the Government of Pakistan in 1995, and fully restored in 2004, at a significant cost. In May 2017, the US-based NGO "EcoSikh" proposed establishment of a 100-acre "sacred forest" around the shrine. The Gurdwara was further expanded in November 2018 with the construction of a new courtyard, museum, library, dormitories and locker rooms spread across an area of 42 acres (17 hectares). There is a 20-foot well, made of small red bricks which is 500 years old and believed to have been built during the lifetime of Guru Nanak Dev.

Access via Kartarpur Corridor

Proposals for visa-free access
The call for a visa-free Kartarpur Sahib corridor was an old, strong, persistent demand from the Sikh community. The move was mooted first during the then Prime Minister of India Atal Bihari Vajpayee’s bus ride to Lahore in 1999, while Pakistani president Pervez Musharraf approved the idea in 2000, and issued various tenders for construction purposes. India, however, maintained that the two-decade-old request has been lying pending with Pakistan. As the shrine lies only 3 kilometers from the border with India, Pakistan, in the year 2000, agreed to allow Sikh pilgrims from India to visit the shrine visa-free by constructing a bridge from the border to the shrine.

In May 2017, Indian parliamentary standing committee members announced that no such corridor would be established, given the poor state of India-Pakistan relations. Instead, it was said that the government of India might install four binoculars for viewing the site from Dera Baba Nanak situated close to the India–Pakistan border in the Gurdaspur district of the Indian state of Punjab.

In August 2018, then Tourism Minister of the Government of Punjab, Navjot Singh Sidhu was invited to the oath-taking ceremony of his friend from cricketing days and newly elected Prime Minister of Pakistan, Imran Khan. After facing criticism for receiving a hug from General Qamar Javed Bajwa, Chief of the Pakistan Army, Sidhu claimed that Bajwa had assured him of opening the corridor before the 550th birth anniversary of Guru Nanak.

The Government of Pakistan in September 2018, unilaterally decided to open the corridor before the 550th birth anniversary of Guru Nanak for visa-free entry of 5000 Indian Sikhs per day from India to Pakistan. The Government of India approved the building and development of Kartarpur corridor from Dera Baba Nanak in Gurdaspur district to International India–Pakistan border. The long-awaited Kartarpur Corridor is taking shape and has been termed a “Corridor of Peace. The step was welcomed by Sikh community across the world. After the corridor opening was confirmed by Pakistan's information minister Fawad Chaudhry, Navjot Singh Sidhu appreciated the friendly gesture of Imran Khan. Kartarpur Corridor was welcomed by United Nations and United States Department of State.

Inauguration
Ahead of Guru Nanak Dev's 550th Prakash Purab celebrations the Kartarpur corridor, connecting Sri Darbar Sahib Dera Baba Nanak in India's Punjab with Gurdwara Darbar Sahib Kartarpur, was thrown open on 9 November 2019 (the anniversary of the Fall of the Berlin Wall) facilitating the first Jatha (batch) of more than 550 pilgrims to travel to the last resting place of Guru Nanak Dev. On Indian side, Prime Minister Narendra Modi thanked his Pakistani counterpart Imran Khan for respecting sentiments of Indians and flagged off the pilgrimage and handed over the flag of the Jatha to Jathedar of Akal Takht Giani Harpreet Singh.

Under the leadership of Akal Takht jathedar Giani Harpreet Singh, the Jatha traveled through the corridor into Pakistan to pay obeisance at Gurdwara Darbar Sahib Kartarpur. On Pakistan side, Imran Khan received the pilgrims and formally inaugurated the Kartarpur corridor by removing a curtain that was lifted by hot air balloons to reveal a huge Kirpan (dagger). Giani Harpreet Singh, speaking at the occasion, thanked both governments for corridor and requested corridor access to Pakistani Sikhs to pay obeisance at Sri Darbar Sahib Dera Baba Nanak on Indian side. Poetry about Guru Nanak, from Muhammad Iqbal's Bang-e-Dara was read by former Indian prime minister Dr. Manmohan Singh and also by Pakistani speakers at inauguration.

Gallery

See also
 List of gurdwaras in Pakistan
 Gurdwara Shahid Ganj Singh Singhania
 Gurdwara Dera Sahib
 Gurdwara Chowa Sahib
 Gurdwara Beri Sahib
 Gurdwara Rori Sahib
 Gurudwara Shaheed Bhai Taru Singh

References

External links

 Kartarpur Corridor 
 www.etpb.gov.pk/kartarpur-corridor, Sri Kartarpur Sahib Corridor official website
 prakashpurb550.mha.gov.in, Indian website portal for registration

1925 establishments in British India
Cultural heritage sites in Punjab, Pakistan
Gurdwaras in Pakistan
Memorials to Guru Nanak
Narowal District
Religious buildings and structures completed in 1925
Rebuilt buildings and structures in Pakistan
Religious buildings and structures in Punjab, Pakistan
Religious buildings and structures with domes
Religious tourism
Tourist attractions in Punjab, Pakistan
20th-century gurdwaras
20th-century architecture in India